α-Pyrrolidinopentiothiophenone (also known as α-PVT) is a synthetic stimulant of the cathinone class that has been sold online as a designer drug. It is an analogue of α-PVP where the phenyl ring has been replaced by thiophene.

α-PVT was first identified in Japan in 2013. Its metabolism has been described in literature.

Side effects

α-PVT has been shown to possess high cytotoxicity against human cell lines.

Legality
Sweden's public health agency suggested classifying α-PVT as hazardous substance on November 10, 2014.

 α-PVT is a controlled substance in China.

α-PVT is illegal in Switzerland .

See also 
 α-Pyrrolidinopropiophenone (α-PPP)
 α-Pyrrolidinobutiophenone (α-PBP)
 α-Pyrrolidinohexiophenone (α-PHP)
 Methiopropamine
 Naphyrone (O-2482)
 Pyrovalerone (O-2371)
 Thiopropamine
 Thiothinone

References 

Cathinones
Designer drugs
Norepinephrine–dopamine reuptake inhibitors
Pyrrolidines
Stimulants
Thiophenes